GVE may refer to:
 Duwet language, native to New Guinea
 Gardenvale railway station, in Victoria, Australia
 Garve railway station, in Scotland
 General visceral efferent fibers
 Grapevine virus E, a plant virus